Olof Björnsson, in legend, was a Swedish king who was referenced in several Old Norse Sagas including  Hervarar saga, Saga of Harald Fairhair and the Styrbjarnar þáttr Svíakappa. Reconstructions that place him as a historical king date his reign to c. 970 – c. 975.

Olof  was the son of Björn Eriksson who ruled as king of Sweden. After the death of their father, Olof ruled jointly with his brother Eric the Victorious (Swedish: Erik Segersäll). By his queen  Ingeborg Thrandsdotter, he was the father of Styrbjörn Starke and Gyrid, queen consort of King Harald Bluetooth. He died of poison during a meal. Eric, instead of proclaiming his nephew Styrbjörn co-ruler, proclaimed his own unborn son to be co-ruler. This son ruled as the historical king Olof Skötkonung.

See also
Early Swedish History

References

975 deaths
10th-century Swedish monarchs
House of Munsö
People whose existence is disputed
Olof 2
Year of birth uncertain